Sogang University Station is a station on the Gyeongui-Jungang Line in Seoul, South Korea. Seogang Station was renamed Sogang University Station on March 17, 2014.

History 
It was opened as Seogang Station on December 1, 1929, but its operation was suspended in 2005 due to the construction of the Gyeongui Central Railway and the Incheon International Airport Railway. It was reopened on December 15, 2012 as a station on the Gyeongui-Jungang Line.

It is located between Gongdeok and Hongik Univ. on the Gyeongui-Jungang Line.

Nearby facilities 
Sogang University, Nogosan Mountain, Sinchon Yonsei Hospital, and Wawasan Mountain are located nearby.

References

External links
 Station information from Korail

Railway stations opened in 1929
Seoul Metropolitan Subway stations
Metro stations in Mapo District
Railway stations at university and college campuses
Sogang University